Ingley is a surname. Notable people with the surname include:

 Alice Ingley (born 1993), Australian archer
 Fred Ingley (1878–1951), British-born American Episcopal bishop
 Milton Ingley (1946–2006), American pornographic actor, producer, and director

See also
 Ingleby (disambiguation)